Maurizio Bobbato (born 17 February 1979, in Castelfranco Veneto) is an Italian middle-distance runner, who won a bronze medal in Birmingham at the 2007 European Athletics Indoor Championships.

Biography
Bobbato is a 5-time winner of the Italian national championships.

Achievements

National titles
1 win in 800 metres at the Italian Athletics Championships (2006) 
3 wins in 800 metres at the Italian Athletics Indoor Championships (2005, 2006, 2007)
1 win in 1500 metres at the Italian Athletics Indoor Championships (2007)

References

External links
 
 Maurizio Bobbato at All-athletics.com

1979 births
Athletics competitors of Centro Sportivo Carabinieri
Italian male middle-distance runners
Living people
World Athletics Championships athletes for Italy
People from Castelfranco Veneto
Sportspeople from the Province of Treviso